WEFM may refer to:

 WEFM (FM), a radio station (95.9 FM) licensed to Michigan City, Indiana, United States
 WE FM, a radio station (99.9 FM) in the country of Saint Vincent and the Grenadines
 WEFM (Trinidad and Tobago), a radio station (96.1 FM) in the country of Trinidad and Tobago
 The former call sign of the Chicago, Illinois FM radio station now broadcasting as WUSN